Hamilton Community High School is a public high school located in Hamilton, Indiana.

Athletics
Hamilton Community High School's athletic teams are the Marines and they compete in the Northeast Corner Conference of Indiana. The school offers a limited range of athletics including:

Baseball
Basketball (Men's and Women's)
Golf
Soccer
Track and field
Volleyball

Basketball
The 2015-2016 Men's basketball team went 4-18 overall and lost to Bethany Christian High School in the first round of the 2015-16 IHSAA Class 1A Boys Basketball State Tournament.

See also
 List of high schools in Indiana

References

External links
 Official Website

Buildings and structures in DeKalb County, Indiana
Schools in DeKalb County, Indiana
Public high schools in Indiana